Gowran Park is a horse race course in County Kilkenny, Ireland. It is located in the Annely Estate near the village of Gowran.The first meeting was held in 1914. and the first ever racecourse commentary in Ireland took place here in 1952.

Gowran Park hosts 16 race days throughout the year with both National Hunt and  Flat meetings.

The racing season at Gowran Park has quality fixtures spread evenly throughout the year starting with the Thyestes Handicap Chase in January.

Notable races

References

External links 
Official website

 
Horse racing venues in the Republic of Ireland
Sports venues in County Kilkenny
Sports venues completed in 1914
1914 establishments in Ireland